Tewodros Kassahun Germamo (born 14 July 1976), known professionally as Teddy Afro, is an Ethiopian singer-songwriter. Known by his revolutionary songs and political dissent sentiment, Teddy is considered one of the most significant Ethiopian artists of all time. Teddy has had a huge cultural impact on the Ethiopian music industry and has been a big influence on many young artists.

Life and career

1976–2001: Early years
Tewodros Kassahun Germamo was born in Addis Ababa, Ethiopia on 14 July 1976 to a singer and songwriter Kassahun Germamo and dancer Tilaye Arage. Tewodros is of ethnic Amhara descent. Despite involving with the entertainment industry, his parents discouraged him to pursue his music career.

2001–2007: Abugida, Teddy and Yasteseryal
Teddy Afro made his debut in 2001 with the album Abugida, quickly establishing himself as a prominent voice in his native country. Mixing reggae, traditional Ethiopian styles, and pop music, his sophomore LP, 2005's Yastesereyal yielded a major hit in its controversial title track, which criticized corruption in the country's government. The song "Hab Dahlak" talks about the division of Ethiopia and Eritrea in terms of couples separating. Four of the album's songs were subsequently banned from media outlets, though "Yastesereyal" sales and influence remained controversial.

His second album Teddy was done in 2000 but released in 2002.

His third album, Yasteseryal was released in 2005. This album was one of the most influential and controversial. Teddy's lyrical sentiments and the release of this album coincided with the elevated political tension in Ethiopia surrounding the 2005 Ethiopian general election. The government banned four of his songs including "Yasteseryal" from playing on Ethiopian media outlets. This restriction was put to rest after the governing party was thrown out of power in April 2018. He has since performed these songs in Addis Ababa Meskel Square concerts. Nonetheless, the album sold more than a million copies within a few months after its release.

2012–2017: Tikur Sew and Ethiopia
After his breakthrough, Teddy released his fourth album, Tikur Sew on 14 April 2012. The album Tikur Sew is dedicated to Emperor Menelik II and the Battle of Adwa, the war of colonial resistance between the Ethiopian forces and the Italian Empire in 1896. The album was the most expensive and most widely sold album in Ethiopia after his fifth album Ethiopia. The album saw huge sales via music markets. According to AdikaRecords' producer Ashenafi Zeleke, the music markets required 500,000 CDs and 200,000 cassettes and the album was in process for sale.

On 22 August 2014, Teddy released "Be 70 Dereja", with 9.1 million views on YouTube within two years. The music video set in 1970s-themed black-and-white scenarios in Ethiopia, including several monuments and places.

Teddy's fifth album, Ethiopia was officially released on 2 May 2017, reached the top of the Billboard World Albums chart in that month, at which time more than 600,000 units had been sold.

2020–present: "Demo Be Abay" and upcoming projects
Kassahun held the Adwa! Wede Fikir Guzo concert on 22 February 2020 to a record-breaking crowd in Addis Ababa Meskel Square.

On 3 August 2020, Teddy released "Demo Be Abay", a song dedicated to the Abbay river, known in English as the Blue Nile River. The song is a critique of Egyptian attitudes, or "Egypt's shamelessness", in regard to its claims over the waters of the river Nile; Egypt had claimed that the filling of the reservoir for the Grand Ethiopian Renaissance Dam would endanger its water supply. On 2 November 2021, he released "Armash", which reflects the ongoing situation in Ethiopia especially the Tigray War and calls for unity of Ethiopians. On 21 June 2022, a song  titled "Na'at" was released following a massacre of 600 Amharas in Gimbi district in West Wollega Zone of Oromia Region. "Na'at" was critical for Abiy Ahmed government over ongoing civil conflict in the country.

Personal life 
Teddy lives in Addis Ababa. He has been married to Ethiopian actress, model, and producer Amleset Muchie since 27 September 2012. They have three children. In October 2022, Amleset expected the fourth child and prepared a baby shower program.

On 6 December 2006, Teddy was jailed for four years in connection with an alleged hit-and-run incident during the 2005 Ethiopian general election. He was accused with driving under the influence when he rammed a 40 years old homeless man. The government sentenced him to six years in prison, and fined with 18000 birr ($1,755). With good behavior, Teddy was released in August 2009.

Artistry
Teddy's earlier work was solely based on reggae fusion but gradually turned with Ethiopian music employing traditional vibrato vocals, and itchy triplet of "Amhara sound".

Award
In 2021, Teddy received an honorary doctorate from Gondar University.

Discography

Studio albums

Non-album singles

DVDs

References

External links
 

1976 births
Living people
21st-century Ethiopian male singers
Ethiopian expatriates in the United States
Reggae singers
Ethiopian philanthropists
Ethiopian people convicted of manslaughter
Ethiopian prisoners and detainees
Ethiopian singer-songwriters
Musicians from Addis Ababa
Prisoners and detainees of Ethiopia